= Qajar navy =

First navy of Persia (established 1885)

The Qajar Navy was the first modern maritime military force established in Iran, formally initiated in 1885 under the reign of Naser al-Din Shah Qajar. Commissioned to secure the country's southern maritime borders and counter growing colonial influence, the fleet established Persia's historical naval presence in the Persian Gulf.
